Crazyhead (previously announced as Crazy Face) is a comedy horror television series created by Howard Overman, who also serves as an executive producer on the show with his company Urban Myth Films.

The six-part series premiered on E4 on 19 October 2016 in the United Kingdom, and internationally on 16 December 2016 on Netflix. The series is filmed in Bristol and is a Channel 4 and Netflix co-production.

In 2017, the show received three RTS West of England awards for Best Sound, Best Design and Best On-Screen Performance for Susie Wokoma as Raquel.

In July 2017, Wokoma confirmed that Crazyhead had been cancelled. The series was later made available on Netflix in the United Kingdom on 16 February 2018.

Cast and characters

Main
 Cara Theobold as Amy, an unhappy bowling alley worker who is a reluctant and rare "seer" – someone who sees demons hiding in society.
 Susan Wokoma as Raquel Francis, a socially awkward, lonely 'seer' and self made demon hunter who befriends Amy.
 Lewis Reeves as Jake, Amy's best friend from school and colleague. He has noticeable feelings for Amy but they are not mutual.
 Arinze Kene as Tyler, Raquel's brother, who shares an attraction with Amy and knows nothing of his sister's demon hunting.
 Riann Steele as Suzanne, Amy's best friend who turns into a revenant.
 Luke Allen-Gale as Sawyer, a demon with powers and Raquel's father.
 Tony Curran as Callum, a powerful demon, disguised as Raquel's psychiatrist.
 Charlie Archer as Harry, a demon who promised Raquel's father that he'd protect Raquel. He then later develops feelings for her.

Recurring
 Billy Seymour as Dylan, a demon and one of Callum's henchmen.
 Lu Corfield as Mercy, a demon moonlighting as a single mother whilst aiding Callum in his plan. She killed Raquel's father, Sawyer.

Episodes

Reception

The show has received generally positive reviews. The Guardian described the show as 'disturbing and excellent' as well as 'fizzy and fun.' They also praised the double act of Cara Theobold and Susan Wokoma. The Daily Telegraph described the show as 'bright, punchy and [a] genuinely funny series'.

References

External links
 
 
 

2010s British comedy television series
2010s British horror television series
2016 British television series debuts
2016 British television series endings
British horror comedy television series
British supernatural television shows
Demons in television
E4 comedy
English-language Netflix original programming
Television series by StudioCanal
Television shows set in Bristol
Television shows shot in Bristol